Saas railway station, also known as Saas im Prättigau railway station, is a railway station in the municipality of Saas im Prättigau, in the Swiss canton of Grisons. It is an intermediate stop on the  gauge Landquart–Davos Platz line of the Rhaetian Railway.

Services
The following services stop at Saas:

 RegioExpress:
 Hourly service between Disentis/Mustér and Scuol-Tarasp.
 Regio:
 Limited service to Scuol-Tarasp.
 Limited service between Landquart and Davos Platz.

References

External links
 
 

Railway stations in Graubünden
Rhaetian Railway stations
Railway stations in Switzerland opened in 1889